Lecointe Guyot is an undersea tablemount located about 430 km north-northwest of Peter I Island in the Southern Ocean. It is named for Georges Lecointe, navigator/astronomer aboard the Belgica. The name was proposed by Dr. Rick Hagen of the Alfred Wegener Institute for Polar and Marine Research, Bremerhaven, Germany, and was approved by the Advisory Committee for Undersea Features in June 1997. The minimal depth is 280m.

References

Seamounts of the Southern Ocean
Guyots